The Soul Stirrers were an American gospel music group, whose career spans over eighty years. The group was a pioneer in the development of the quartet style of gospel, and a major influence on soul, doo wop, and Motown, some of the secular music that owed much to gospel.

Biography
The group was formed by (Silas) Roy Crain, launching his first quartet who sang in a jubilee style, in 1926 in Trinity, Texas, United States. In the early 1930s, after Crain moved to Houston, he joined an existing group on the condition that it change its name to "the Soul Stirrers". The name "Soul Stirrers" yields from the description of one of Roy Crain's earlier quartets as "soul-stirring." Among the members of that group was R.H. (Rebert) Harris, who soon became its musical leader. The Soul Stirrers, formed as a jubilee quartet, transformed their sound, influenced by hard gospel singers such as Mahalia Jackson and Sister Rosetta Tharpe.

Rebert Harris, also from Trinity, Texas, brought several changes to the Soul Stirrers that affected gospel quartet singing generally. He used a falsetto style that had its antecedents in African music, but which was new to the popular jubilee singing style of the time. He pioneered the "swing lead"---in which two singers would share the job of leading the song, allowing virtuoso singers to increase the emotional intensity of the song as the lead passed between them without disturbing the four part harmony. That innovation led the Soul Stirrers, while still called a quartet, to acquire five members.

The Soul Stirrers made other important changes in those years: ad-libbing lyrics, singing in delayed time, and repeating words in the background as both a rhythmic and emotional support for the lead singers. The Soul Stirrers along with other quartet performers, dropped the "flatfooted" style of jubilee quartets before them and expanded their repertoire from spirituals and traditional hymns to the newer gospel compositions. The group also loosened the rigid arrangements that jubilee quartets had favored to permit individual singers within the group more space for individual development.

In 1936, Alan Lomax recorded the Soul Stirrers for the Library of Congress's American music project, and those four unissued recordings are in the American Folklife Center collection today. They later moved to Chicago, where they broadcast a weekly radio show (WIND) with other famous groups including Golden Gate Quartet and The Famous Blue Jay Singers. As the gospel quartet style of singing became more popular, groups would perform in competitions called "song battles" to further increase the genre's popularity.

As World War II began, it became more difficult for many gospel quartet groups to make a living. It resulted in some quartets supplementing their income by doing live performances at churches, schools, and neighborhood centers. Despite the economic situation, throughout the 1940s and leading into the 1950s, many gospel quartet groups were able to pursue their careers successfully. The Soul Stirrers' nationwide touring gained them an even larger audience.

The Soul Stirrers signed with Specialty Records, where they recorded a number of tracks, including "By and By" and "In That Awful Hour". Harris quit in late 1950 to form a new group, citing dissatisfaction with what he viewed as the crookedness of the business and immoral behavior by musicians he saw on the "Gospel Highway" touring circuit. He was briefly replaced on lead by Paul Foster, then by Sam Cooke. Cooke joined the group at 19 and served as lead vocalist from 1950 to 1956.

One of the early singles with Cooke was "Jesus Gave Me Water", a major hit that brought the Soul Stirrers acclaim. Thomas L. Breuster was replaced by Bob King and, briefly, Julius Cheeks. When Cooke left in 1957 to pursue a career in pop music, the Soul Stirrers' preeminence in gospel was essentially over, though a brief period of success with Johnnie Taylor sustained the group for a time.  The group made several appearances performing on TV Gospel Time in early 1960s. Various line-ups continued touring and recording throughout the last half of the century to a small and devoted following. The group — and all of its members — was inducted into the Rock and Roll Hall of Fame in 1989 as one of rock's 'Early Influences', and into the Vocal Group Hall of Fame in 2000. In 2022 their 1950 recording "Jesus Gave Me Water" was selected by the US Library of Congress for preservation in the National Recording Registry.

References

Further reading
Tony Heilbut, The Gospel Sound: Good News and Bad Times. Limelight Editions, 1997, .
Horace Clarence Boyer, How Sweet the Sound: The Golden Age of Gospel. Elliott and Clark, 1995, .
Jerry Zolten, Great God A' Mighty!:The Dixie Hummingbirds - Celebrating the Rise of Soul Gospel Music, Oxford University Press, 2003, .
Michael Corcoran, "All Over the Map: True Heroes of Texas Music". Austin: University of Texas, 2005.
Peter Guralnick, "Dream Boogie: The Triumph of Sam Cooke". New York: Little, Brown and Company, 2005.
Rachel Rubin ed., "American Popular Music". Amherst: University of Massachusetts, 2001.
Daniel Wolff, "You Send Me". New York: William Morrow and Company, 1995.
Mark Burford, "Soul Stirrers" in Encyclopedia of American Gospel Music. New York: Routledge, 2005.

External links
Vocal Group Hall of Fame page on The Soul Stirrers

Musical groups established in 1926
American gospel musical groups
Christian rhythm and blues groups
Gospel quartets
Imperial Records artists
Specialty Records artists
Sam Cooke
People from Trinity, Texas